"Hard to Say I'm Sorry" is a 1982 power ballad by the group Chicago. It was written by bassist Peter Cetera, who also sang the lead vocals on the track, and producer David Foster. It was released on May 17, 1982, as the lead single from the album Chicago 16. On September 11 it reached No. 1 for two weeks on the Billboard Hot 100. It was the group's second No. 1 single. It was their first top 50 hit since "No Tell Lover" in 1978 and it spent twelve weeks in the top 5 of the Billboard Hot 100. The single was nominated for a Grammy Award for Best Pop Performance by a Duo or Group with Vocal, and was certified gold by the Recording Industry Association of America (RIAA) in September of the same year. Songwriter Cetera, a member of the American Society of Composers, Authors and Publishers (ASCAP), won an ASCAP Pop Music Award for the song in the category, Most Performed Songs.

History
The song, as well as the album on which it is featured, was a marked departure from Chicago's traditional soft rock, horn-driven sound, taking on a polished and modern feel. With minimal horns, the track instead featured more layered synthesizers and heavier distorted guitar in a 1980s power ballad styling. A second movement of the song, "Get Away", prominently does feature the Chicago horns, and it was co-written by Robert Lamm.

Deviating from Chicago's practice of having mostly band members playing on their albums, "Hard to Say I'm Sorry" featured several session musicians.  The song featured producer David Foster on the piano, Michael Landau and Chris Pinnick on guitars as well as two members of the American rock band Toto, including David Paich and Steve Porcaro both contributing synthesizers. The song's vocals were performed by Peter Cetera, who also plays acoustic guitar. The only other member of Chicago besides Cetera that played on the track was drummer Danny Seraphine.

Billboard called it a "stately pop ballad" with "even more of an orchestral sweep than usual."

The song was also featured as the ending theme in the movie and soundtrack for Summer Lovers, a 1982 film written and directed by Randal Kleiser, starring Peter Gallagher, Daryl Hannah and Valerie Quennessen, and filmed on location on the island of Santorini, Greece.

Music video
Chicago made a music video for the song. According to Cetera, the videos for "Hard to Say I'm Sorry" and "Love Me Tomorrow" were shot on the same day. The band appears in a black colored room with diamonds on the wall.

Charts

Weekly charts

Year-end charts

All-time charts

Certifications and sales

Az Yet version

American R&B group Az Yet included a cover version of "Hard to Say I'm Sorry" on their 1996 self-titled debut album, which was produced by Babyface. A remix version by David Foster was released as a single on February 3, 1997 and features vocals from Peter Cetera. Foster won a BMI Pop Award for this version. The song peaked at number seven on the UK Singles Chart and number eight on the Billboard Hot 100. It reached platinum status and was nominated for a Grammy Award for Best Performance by an R&B Group or Duo with Vocal. Aside from the David Foster remix, the single includes the album version (without Cetera), an a cappella version, and an extended remix.

Track listing
CD-single
 "Hard to Say I'm Sorry" (David Foster Remix featuring Peter Cetera) 3:18	
 "Hard to Say I'm Sorry" (Album Version) 3:14
 "Hard to Say I'm Sorry" (Acappella) 3:14
 "Hard to Say I'm Sorry" (Chase Extended Mix) 5:14

Charts

Weekly charts

Year-end charts

Certifications

Release history

Notable cover versions
 In 1983, Hong Kong Singer Leslie Cheung released a Cantonese cover version with Chinese title "難以再說對不起" in his album "".
 In 2015, country music star Tim McGraw released a "behind-the-scenes" video of him and his band performing "Hard to Say I'm Sorry" as a warm-up for his show in Chicago. At the end of the song he turns to the camera and says, "Hello, Chicago."
 In January 2017, Roger Federer tweeted a video of him singing the song with fellow professional tennis players Tommy Haas and Grigor Dimitrov, with David Foster at the piano, while at the Australian Open.  Haas is the son-in-law of Foster.

See also
List of RPM number-one singles of 1982
List of number-one hits of 1982 (Switzerland)
List of Hot 100 number-one singles of 1982 (U.S.)
List of number-one adult contemporary singles of 1982 (U.S.)

References

1982 songs
1982 singles
1997 singles
Chicago (band) songs
Az Yet songs
1980s ballads
1990s ballads
Billboard Hot 100 number-one singles
Irish Singles Chart number-one singles
Number-one singles in New Zealand
Number-one singles in Switzerland
RPM Top Singles number-one singles
Song recordings produced by David Foster
Song recordings produced by Babyface (musician)
Songs written by David Foster
Songs written by Peter Cetera
Arista Records singles
Full Moon Records singles
LaFace Records singles
Warner Records singles
Rock ballads